The United Kingdom general elections overview is an overview of United Kingdom general election results since 1922. The 1922 election was the first election in the new United Kingdom of Great Britain and Northern Ireland, after the creation of the Irish Free State removed Southern Ireland from the UK.

Summary

Table 
The table below gives a summary of the results of each general election since 1922 for the main political parties. Parties with the highest vote share and the most seats at each election are highlighted in bold. More comprehensive detail showing all parties which fielded candidates are shown in the subsequent sections. Please refer to notes below the table.

Notes 
1Includes Ulster Unionists up to and including the 1970 election, and the autonomous Unionist Party in Scotland until 1964. Also includes the Liberal National Party (and joint candidates) from 1945 to 1966.

2Liberal Party up to 1979; SDP-Liberal Alliance in 1983 and 1987; Liberal Democrats from 1992.

3Scottish National Party and Plaid Cymru (Party of Wales) combined. Prior to 1970, these are included in the Other column.

4Northern Ireland parties: up to 1970, party affiliations largely followed those of the rest of the UK (with Ulster Unionists included with the Conservatives); from 1974, Northern Ireland had a completely independent party system and the vote share and seats listed represent the totals for Northern Ireland.

5In 1922 the Liberals were split between the main Liberal Party (18.9%, 62 seats) and the National Liberals (9.9%, 53 seats).

6In 1931 and 1935 the figures for the Conservatives relate to National Government candidates and comprise Conservative, National Labour, Liberal National and National vote share and seats.

7In 2015, Other included record votes shares for both the UK Independence Party 12.6% and the Green Party (3.8%), each winning just 1 seat.

Graphs

2015–2019 
The period from 2015 to 2019 was one of the most turbulent periods in British electoral history. Following the Conservative–Liberal Democrat coalition, the Conservatives, led by David Cameron, won the 2015 general election with a small majority, having promised to hold a referendum on continued membership of the European Union. This election saw  the Liberal Democrats vote fall from 23% to 8% and MPs elected from 57 to 8. In terms of the popular vote, they were replaced as the third party by the UK Independence Party, who achieved 13%, although they won only 1 seat. The Green Party also achieved their best ever result with 4% of the popular vote. In Scotland, the Scottish National Party gained 50% of the popular vote, winning all but three of the 59 seats, mostly at the expense of the Labour Party.

Following the EU referendum held in June 2016, which resulted in a majority of 52:48 to leave, David Cameron resigned as Prime Minister and was replaced by Theresa May. In June 2017, May called a snap election; but the Conservatives lost their overall majority and had to rely on the support of the 10 MPs from the Democratic Unionist Party to continue in Government. The following two years were dominated by attempts to pass through Parliament a negotiated deal on the terms for leaving the EU, but these were opposed by both Brexiteers and Remainers in the Conservative Party, as well as the Opposition parties. Eventually, Mrs May resigned and Boris Johnson became Prime Minister.

After further government defeats, a general election was  held in December 2019 - the first December election since 1923 - which resulted in an 80-seat majority for the Conservatives, gaining many seats which Labour had held since at least 1945. The United Kingdom formally left the European Union on 31 January 2020.

1979–2010
This period saw five prime ministers, with Margaret Thatcher and Tony Blair the two longest serving post-World War II prime ministers in the UK (the other prime ministers during this period being John Major, Gordon Brown and David Cameron). There was also a mini-revival of the Liberal Party which, after a merger with the Social Democratic Party became the Liberal Democrats and increased their seats in parliament from 11 in the 1979 election to 62 in 2005.

Following their victory in 1979, the Conservatives were also successful in the subsequent three general elections, resulting in 18 years of continuous power. The newly formed Social Democratic Party and the Liberal Party contested the 1983 and 1987 elections as the SDP-Liberal Alliance. Although the combined parties achieved a popular vote of 22.6% in 1983, they initially failed to make a breakthrough in terms of seats, winning 22.

The Labour party won a landslide victory in 1997 and were also successful in 2001 and 2005. The now merged Liberal Democrats also improved their seat count in this period. The outcome of the 2010 election brought about the first hung parliament since 1974. The victorious Conservative Party accepted the Liberal Democrats as their coalition partner.

In Northern Ireland, the Good Friday Agreement has led to a reduction in conflict, though the traditional parties who gained power in the 1980s, such as the Ulster Unionist Party, have been replaced as the dominant powers by the likes of Sinn Féin and the Democratic Unionist Party.

The elections of the 1990s and 2000s (decade) also saw a proliferation of smaller parties, with more parties standing at the 2005 general election than ever before. Voter turnout also fell during this period, with the 2001 election seeing a post-World War II low of 59.4%.

1955–1974
The elections of this period took place in the context of the decolonialisation of the British Empire and the UK's declining status as a Great Power. It also saw the UK enter the European Union and some periods of high unemployment. The early years of the period saw Conservative consolidation of power, before Harold Wilson's two general election wins in 1964 and 1966. There was then a series of close fought elections, including two in 1974. This period was also the one in which the Liberal Party was at its all-time low, never having more than 14 seats (though it had been in 1951 when they'd had their lowest ever percentage of the vote).

The Ulster Unionists dominated in Northern Ireland, whilst the Scottish National Party and Plaid Cymru became major players for the first time, the SNP gaining 11 seats in 1974. This period also saw the demise of the autonomous Unionist Party in Scotland and the National Liberal Party, which both merged with the Conservative Party.

1929–1951
This era saw massive social change in the UK, going through the Great Depression of the 1930s, resulting in a National Government; the Coalition Government of the Second World War led by Winston Churchill; and the socialist Labour government of Clement Attlee. This was also the period of the Liberal Party's major collapse and the completion of Labour's rise to power.

The 1929 election resulted in the Labour Party having the greatest number of seats and they formed a Government under Ramsay MacDonald with the support of the Liberals. As a result of the growing economic crisis, McDonald formed a National Government in 1931 with the support of the Conservatives and Liberals, which was not however backed by the majority of Labour MPs. This was followed by a general election at which the National coalition, dominated by the Conservatives, won a landslide victory, with the opposition Labour Party reduced to a rump of 52 seats. It also led to a permanent split in the Liberal Party, with the National Liberals eventually joining the Conservatives. Although Labour recovered somewhat, the (notional) National Government won the 1935 election.

General elections were suspended during the Second World War, when all three major parties entered into a coalition under Churchill. The Labour party gained a landslide victory in 1945. Although they won a small majority in the 1950, they were defeated by the Conservatives in 1951, with Churchill returning to power.

1922–1924
In the years after the secession of the Irish Free State, the Conservatives led the House of Commons, followed by a surging Labour Party and a declining Liberal Party. The Communist Party of Great Britain also enjoyed their most prolonged period of success, though still failed to have more than 1 MP at any time.

The 1922 election was won by the Conservatives, with the Labour party in second place and the Liberals split. In 1923, the Conservatives lost their majority and the Labour Party were put into office for the first time with the support of the re-united Liberals. However, this minority government only lasted 10 months and the 1924 election saw the return of the Conservatives with a large majority and the Liberal Party reduced to a rump of 40 MPs, from which they never really recovered.

See also
 Elections in the United Kingdom
 List of United Kingdom general elections

References

External links
 House of Commons Library: "UK Election Statistics: 1918-2019 - A century of elections"